The Nepal ground skink (Ablepharus nepalensis) is a species of skink found in Nepal.

References

Ablepharus
Reptiles described in 1998
Taxa named by Valery Konstantinovich Eremchenko
Taxa named by Notker Helfenberger